Interiors is the fourth release and second full-length album from Bloomington, Indiana-based instrumental rock group, Ativin.  This album strayed from Ativin's typical instrument line-up of guitar, baritone guitar and drums by adding strings on certain tracks, sometimes very prominently.

Track listing
 "Interiors" – 3:41
 "Rub out the Woods" – 3:45
 "Scissors" – 2:51
 "Underwater" – 3:29
 "Two Knives as Crutches" – 1:59
 "A Single Crease" – 1:46
 "End of Tape" – 2:48
 "When the Sky Turns Clear" – 7:20
 "Near North" – 2:57
 "Dead Horses" – 4:50
 "Under Blankets" – 2:30

References

2002 albums
Secretly Canadian albums
Ativin albums